Telekon is the second solo studio album by English musician Gary Numan. It debuted at the top of the UK Albums Chart in September 1980, making it his third consecutive (and to date, final) No. 1 album. It was also the third and final studio release of what Numan retrospectively termed the "machine" section of his career, following 1979's Replicas and The Pleasure Principle.

Releases and promoting
Telekon was released in September 1980. To boost initial sales in the UK, on first release the album came with a free single, in a plain black sleeve, including two live recordings from 'The Touring Principle' tour; 'Remember I Was Vapour' and 'On Broadway'. A year later, in an attempt to further boost sales, the album came with a free poster in the UK using a photo taken from the main Telekon photo-shoot. The cassette release included the singles We Are Glass and I Die: You Die which was not on the vinyl LP.

A number of Dutch releases were pressed on coloured vinyl. The US and Canadian releases replaced the track Sleep by Windows with I Die: You Die. The album was released on vinyl and cassette in Japan.

Singles
Telekon was preceded by two non-album singles, "We Are Glass" and "I Die: You Die". The only single taken from the album after its release was the opening number, "This Wreckage", which peaked at No. 20. Numan later admitted that, regardless of its merits as a song, it was a "bloody stupid single". The live version of Remember I Was Vapour, released as a bonus single with the UK album, was released as a 12" single in Germany with the studio version on the B-side. Remind Me to Smile was released as a US single with I Dream of Wires on the B-side.

The Teletour
From September to November 1980, Numan toured the UK and North America in support of Telekon. The tour was followed by three "farewell concerts" at Wembley Arena in April 1981 with guest Nash the Slash.

Classic Album Tour and Micromusic DVD
In December 2006, Numan undertook a Telekon "Classic Album" tour, comprising four concerts in the UK in which he played all the songs from the Telekon album, as well as its associated singles and B-sides. On the 2CD EKO: The Telekon 06 Audio Programme (sold at the 2006 Telekon gigs and from Numan's website), Numan discussed (with interviewer Steve Malins) the making of Telekon, revealing that it is his favourite of his "early albums." Numan followed the 2006 tour with further "Classic Album" tours, for Replicas in 2008 and The Pleasure Principle in 2009.

In 2006, Numan promised fans a DVD release of the 1981 Micromusic video. On his official website in October 2008, Numan announced that the long-lost master tapes of the Micromusic concert had been found, "in excellent condition and, to make things even better, more footage has been found from two other camera positions that were not used on the original version. This new footage will be edited into a new updated version...We expect this to be, with all the extra footage and interviews, a double disc DVD." On 19 March 2010, Numan announced that the Micromusic DVD would be released on 13 April. Micromusic was released on that date as a one-disc DVD; in addition to the concert itself, the DVD featured an hour-long interview with Numan as a special feature.

Cultural references

NME used the track title "I Dream of Wires" as the name for a fictitious synthpop act about which they published a series of spoof articles in early 1995, culminating in reports of the alleged band's death in a coach crash in Eastern Europe. "I Dream of Wires" was covered by British singer Robert Palmer on his 1980 album Clues, featuring Numan on keyboards and synthesisers.

Track listing
All songs written and composed by Gary Numan except for "Trois Gymnopédies (First Movement)", which is a composition by Erik Satie.

LP

Cassette

1998 CD reissue

Subsequent digital issues of Telekon revert to the original intro mix for "Remind Me to Smile".

Charts

Weekly charts

Year-end charts

Personnel
 Gary Numan – vocals, Minimoog, Polymoog, ARP Pro Soloist, Roland Jupiter-4, Sequential Circuits Prophet-5, Yamaha CP-30, Roland CR-78, Synare, guitar, piano, Minibass 
 Paul Gardiner – bass, backing vocals
 Cedric Sharpley – drums, percussion, backing vocals
 Chris Payne – viola, piano, Minimoog, Polymoog, backing vocals
 Russell Bell – guitars, violin, claves, backing vocals
 Denis Haines – Prophet-5, piano, ARP Pro Soloist, Yamaha CP-30, whistle, backing vocals
 John Webb, James Freud, Simple Minds – handclaps

Notes

References
 Paul Goodwin (2004). Electric Pioneer: An Armchair Guide to Gary Numan
 [ Allmusic]

Gary Numan albums
1980 albums
Beggars Banquet Records albums